Kiowa is a city in Barber County, Kansas, United States.  As of the 2020 census, the population of the city was 902.  It is located 1 mile north of the Kansas / Oklahoma state border.

History

19th century
Kiowa was founded in 1872. It was named for the Kiowa people.

20th century
On June 7, 1900, anti-saloon advocate Carrie Nation vandalized her first saloon in Kiowa.

In 1905, the Denver, Enid and Gulf Railroad was built from Enid, Oklahoma to Kiowa.  In 1907, it was sold to the Atchison, Topeka and Santa Fe Railway.  In 1996, the line from Kiowa to Blanton, Oklahoma was abandoned.

Geography
Kiowa is located at  (37.017520, -98.484721).

Demographics

2010 census
As of the census of 2010, there were 1,026 people, 466 households, and 273 families living in the city. The racial makeup of the city was 95.3% White, 0.2% African American, 1.2% Native American, 0.2% Asian, 1.8% from other races, and 1.4% from two or more races. Hispanic or Latino of any race were 4.1% of the population.

There were 466 households, of which 24.5% had children under the age of 18 living with them, 48.1% were married couples living together, 6.9% had a female householder with no husband present, 3.6% had a male householder with no wife present, and 41.4% were non-families. 36.5% of all households were made up of individuals, and 19.3% had someone living alone who was 65 years of age or older. The average household size was 2.14 and the average family size was 2.79.

The median age in the city was 46.9 years. 21.8% of residents were under the age of 18; 7.6% were between the ages of 18 and 24; 18.5% were from 25 to 44; 28.5% were from 45 to 64; and 23.7% were 65 years of age or older. The gender makeup of the city was 49.0% male and 51.0% female.

2000 census
As of the census of 2000, there were 1,055 people, 467 households, and 292 families living in the city. The racial makeup of the city was 95.83% White, 0.28% African American, 1.23% Native American, 1.71% from other races, and 0.95% from two or more races. Hispanic or Latino of any race were 4.27% of the population.

There were 467 households, out of which 25.7% had children under the age of 18 living with them, 54.6% were married couples living together, 5.8% had a female householder with no husband present, and 37.3% were non-families. 36.2% of all households were made up of individuals, and 24.0% had someone living alone who was 65 years of age or older. The average household size was 2.19 and the average family size was 2.87.

In the city, the population was spread out, with 23.6% under the age of 18, 4.7% from 18 to 24, 21.3% from 25 to 44, 24.4% from 45 to 64, and 26.0% who were 65 years of age or older. The median age was 45 years. For every 100 females, there were 84.1 males. For every 100 females age 18 and over, there were 76.8 males.

The median income for a household in the city was $31,141, and the median income for a family was $41,806. Males had a median income of $31,667 versus $21,083 for females. The per capita income for the city was $16,670. About 9.7% of families and 14.2% of the population were below the poverty line, including 23.1% of those under age 18 and 6.5% of those age 65 or over.

Education
The community is served by South Barber USD 255 public school district.

The Kiowa Chieftains won the Kansas State High School class B Track & Field championship in 1940.

Media
Kiowa is served by a weekly newspaper, The Kiowa News.

Infrastructure
K-2 and K-8 highways, and the Southern Transcon main line of BNSF Railway pass through Kiowa.

Notable people
 Marcellus Boss, the 5th Civilian Governor of Guam; former Kiowa city attorney.
 Charles E. Brown, Jr., Chief of Chaplains of the U.S. Army.
 Bill Tidwell, four-time NAIA middle distance champion at Kansas State Teachers College (ESU), then coach and athletic director
 James Wilson, former Colorado State Representative

See also
 RSI Corporation

References

Further reading

External links
 City of Kiowa
 Kiowa - Directory of Public Officials
 USD 255, local school district
 Kiowa, Barber County, Kansas Barber County, Kansas: History and Genealogy
 Kiowa city map, KDOT

Cities in Kansas
Cities in Barber County, Kansas
1872 establishments in Kansas
Populated places established in 1872